Leoncio or Leôncio is a given name. Notable people with the name include:

Leoncio Afonso, (born 1916), Spanish academic in the geography, history and toponymics of the Canary Islands
Ricardo Leoncio Elías Arias (1874–1951), Peruvian soldier and politician, briefly President of Peru from March 1–5, 1931
Leoncio Basbaum or Leôncio Basbaum (1907–1969), Brazilian Marxist historian
Leoncio P. Deriada, Filipino writer
Leoncio Evita Enoy (1929–1996), intellectual, painter and writer from Equatorial Guinea
Leoncio Prado Gutiérrez (1853–1883), Peruvian mariner
Leoncio Lara (best known as Leoncio Lara 'Bon') is a Mexican composer and former rock band member
Bárbara Leôncio (born 1991), young Brazilian athlete, world champion in the 200 metres in 2007
Carlos Leôncio de Magalhães (1875–1931), Brazilian farmer and businessman
Leoncio Morán Sánchez (born 1966), Mexican politician from the National Action Party
Leoncio Alonso González de Gregorio, 22nd Duke of Medina Sidonia (born 1956), Spanish aristocrat and historian
Leoncio Vidal (1864–1896), Cuban revolutionary that fought in the Cuban War of Independence
the Spanish name of the animated character Lippy the Lion

See also
Leoncio Prado Military Academy, Peruvian educational institution founded in 1943
Leoncio Prado Province, one of eleven provinces of the Huánuco Region in Peru
Leoncio Prado District, Huaura, one of twelve districts of the province Huaura in Peru
Leoncio Prado District, Lucanas, one of twenty-one districts of the province Lucanas in Peru
Leon (disambiguation)
Leoncito (disambiguation)
Leoni (disambiguation)
Leono

Leoncio Mavuduru Sibeko Born 19.10.2010 far east hospital home 96 Benue rive  chief albert luthuli Park Benoni

es:Leoncio